Project 22220, also known through the Russian type size series designation LK-60Ya, is a series of Russian nuclear-powered icebreakers. The lead ship of the class, Arktika, was delivered in 2020 and surpassed the preceding Soviet-built series of nuclear-powered icebreakers as the largest and most powerful icebreaker in the world.

, three Project 22220 icebreakers (Arktika, Sibir and Ural) are in service, fourth (Yakutiya) has been launched, fifth (Chukotka) has been laid down at Baltic Shipyard in Saint Petersburg, and a sixth and seventh are on order.

Development

LK-60Ya

After the Second World War, the Soviet Union launched an ambitious marine transportation development program with the intention of turning the ice-covered Northern Sea Route into a navigable shipping route which could be then used to extract natural resources from the Arctic. This included replacing the obsolete steam-powered icebreakers with more powerful diesel-electric vessels and culminated with the construction of the first nuclear-powered icebreaker in the late 1950s. The second phase, which began in the early 1970s and continued until the dissolution of the Soviet Union, further expanded the Soviet icebreaker fleet with additional nuclear- and diesel-powered icebreakers that enabled uninterrupted year-round operation in the western part of the Northern Sea Route as well as extended the navigating season in the eastern sector.

In the 1980s, studies by the Central Marine Research and Design Institute (CNIIMF) and the Central Design Bureau "Iceberg" resulted in "icebreaker type size series" ranging from 7-megawatt auxiliary icebreakers (LK-7) to a 110-megawatt nuclear-powered "icebreaker-leaders" (LK-110Ya). One of the proposed new icebreaker classes, LK-60Ya, was developed as a direct replacement for the previous-generation Arktika-class nuclear-powered icebreakers which had entered service in the late 1970s and seen widespread use in the Russian Arctic. In addition to operating as heavy line icebreakers along the full length of the Northern Sea Route from Murmansk all the way to the Bering Strait, the new 60-megawatt icebreakers would also replace the shallow-draft nuclear-powered icebreakers Taymyr and Vaygach on the Dudinka-Murmansk route which included icebreaking operations in the Yenisey river estuary. The latter operation was made possible by the novel dual-draft functionality, ability to de-ballast the vessel when approaching shallow coastal areas. Other technical characteristics of the next-generation nuclear-powered icebreakers were drawn from the Russians' extensive operational experience from Arctic shipping. For example, it was determined that in order to ensure reliable year-round navigation in the western part of the Northern Sea Route, LK-60Ya would have to be capable of breaking at least  ice, an improvement over the old Arktikas  icebreaking capability.

While traffic volumes along the Northern Sea Route declined drastically in the early 1990s due to the slowdown of the Russian economy, an ambitious fleet renewal program was nonetheless launched under the presidential program Revival of the Merchant Fleet of Russia (1993–2000). In the end, none of the planned icebreakers were built and the follow-up federal program Modernization of the transport system of Russia (2002–2010) included funding for the construction of only two new diesel-electric icebreakers in addition to completing the unfinished Arktika-class icebreaker 50 Let Pobedy and starting the preliminary design development of the next generation nuclear-powered icebreakers.

Project 22220

Although the preliminary design had been developed already in the late 1980s, the final technical design of LK-60Ya was completed in 2009 by Central Design Bureau "Iceberg" as Project22220. 

The construction of the lead ship was awarded to Saint Petersburg-based Baltic Shipyard, part of the state-owned United Shipbuilding Corporation, in August 2012 with a contract price of 36.959 billion rubles (about US$1.16 billion). A 84.4 billion ruble (about US$2.4 billion) follow-up contract for two additional vessels was signed in May 2014 and a second contract, worth over 100 billion rubles (about US$1.5 billion), for two more in August 2019. In January 2023, the Russian government allocated 58.9 billion rubles (about US$820 million) for financing 50% of the construction of two additional Project 22220 icebreakers and the shipbuilding contract was signed on 2 February.

With the Project22220 icebreakers under construction, focus was to have moved to the development of even larger and more powerful nuclear-powered icebreakers known as Project 10510 "Leader", with the first ship expected to be commissioned in 2027. However, in early 2023, additional Project 10510 vessels appeared to have been cancelled in favour of two additional Project 22220 ships.

Construction

The construction of the first Project22220 icebreaker began with a steel cutting ceremony on 1 November 2012 and the keel of the lead ship of the class was laid on the slipway on 5 November 2013. In a launching ceremony on 16 June 2016, the icebreaker was named Arktika after the first surface ship to reach the North Pole that was in service in 1975–2008. While initially scheduled for delivery by December 2017, the construction of the lead Project22220 icebreaker fell behind schedule due to problems related to the delivery of domestically-sourced components. Arktika began the first stage of sea trials in Gulf of Finland under diesel power on 12 December 2019 and returned to Saint Petersburg two days later. The next sea trials, during which the vessel would be tested under nuclear power for the first time, commenced on 23 June and concluded on 13 July. Shortly after completing the final sea trials by mid-September, Arktika sailed from Saint Petersburg to Murmansk via the North Pole where the icebreaker arrived on 3 October. The flag-raising ceremony marking the vessel's entry to service was held in Murmansk on 21 October 2020.

The keel of the second Project22220 icebreaker (referred to as the "first serial ship" of the class in Russia) was laid on 26 May 2015. The icebreaker was launched as Sibir on 22 September 2017. Previously, the name had been used on the second Arktika-class icebreaker that was in service in 1977–1992. As with the lead ship, the problems with equipment delivery have postponed the delivery of the vessel from 2018 to late 2021. Sibir left for first sea trials on 16 November 2021 and returned to Saint Petersburg at the end of the month. After second sea trials, Sibir was delivered to Atomflot on 24 December 2021. The vessel began icebreaking operations in the Kara Sea in January 2022.

The keel-laying ceremony of the third ("second serial") Project22220 icebreaker was held on 25 July 2016 shortly after the partially-assembled hull of Sibir had been moved down the slipway for final hull assembly. The vessel was launched on 27 May 2019 as Ural (after the Ural Mountains). The name had previously been selected for the final Arktika-class icebreaker when it was laid down in 1989, but during the construction the vessel was renamed 50 Let Pobedy. The delivery of the vessel, initially scheduled for 2020, was postponed first to 2021 and then to late 2022. After completing sea trials in record time between 14 and 31 October 2022, the flag-raising ceremony was held on Ural on 22 November 2022. The icebreaker left for its homeport, Murmansk, on the following day.

Steel cutting for the fourth ("third serial") Project22220 icebreaker was laid down on 26 May 2020 and launched on 22 November 2022. The vessel will be named Yakutiya (after the Republic of Sakha (Yakutia)). 

The keel-laying ceremony of the fifth ("fourth serial") Project 22220 icebreaker, Chukotka (after Chukotka Autonomous Okrug), was held on 16 December 2020.

The sixth ("fifth serial") and seventh ("sixth serial") Project 22220 icebreakers are on order with deliveries scheduled for December 2028 and December 2030.

Design

General characteristics 

In order to be able to operate efficiently both in shallow Arctic river estuaries as well as along the Northern Sea Route, the draught of the Project 22220 icebreakers can be varied by taking in and discharging ballast water. In terms of size, Project 22220 icebreakers are  longer and  wider than 50 Let Pobedy, previously the world's largest icebreaker, and at full load have about one third greater displacement.

Power, propulsion and performance 

Like the preceding Russian nuclear-powered icebreakers since the 1959-built Lenin, Project22220 icebreakers feature a nuclear-turbo-electric powertrain in which nuclear reactors produce steam for turbogenerators which, in turn, generate electrical power for propulsion motors driving the ship's propellers.

The onboard nuclear power plant consists of two RITM-200 pressurized water reactors with a thermal output of 175 each. The reactors, developed by OKBM Afrikantov, use up to 20% enriched Uranium-235 and, when operating with a capacity factor of 0.65, require refueling every seven years over a 40-year planned service life. Two main turbogenerators produced by Kirov-Energomash each generate 36megawatts of electrical power at 3,000rpm.

The propulsion system of Project22220 icebreakers follows the classic polar icebreaker pattern with three shaft lines and a single rudder. The  four-bladed fixed pitch propellers, each driven by a  electric motor, are made of stainless steel and weigh about  apiece.

Ships in class

See also
Shipbuilding in Russia

Notes

References